Frederick I, called the Brave or the Bitten (German: Friedrich der Freidige or Friedrich der Gebissene; 1257 – 16 November 1323) was Margrave of Meissen and Landgrave of Thuringia.

Life
Born in Eisenach, Frederick was the son of Albert II, Margrave of Meissen and Margaret of Sicily. According to legend, his mother, fleeing her philandering husband in 1270, was overcome by the pain of parting and bit Frederick on the cheek: therefore he became known as the Bitten.

After the death of Conradin in 1268, he became the legitimate heir to the Hohenstaufen claims, and claimed the Kingdom of Sicily, briefly taking the titles of King of Jerusalem and Sicily and Duke of Swabia. (While not descended from the Kings of Jerusalem, his grandfather Frederick II, Holy Roman Emperor, had claimed the kingdom for himself.)

However, these claims met with little favor. Swabia, pawned by Conradin before his last expedition, was disintegrating as a territorial unit. He went unrecognized in Outremer, and Charles of Anjou was deeply entrenched in power in Southern Italy. Margrave Frederick proposed an invasion of Italy in 1269, and attracted some support from the Lombard Ghibellines, but his plans were never carried out, and he played no further part in Italian affairs. From 1280, he was count palatine of Saxony.

Because his father preferred their half-brother Apitz, Frederick and his brother Diezmann waged war upon him. Frederick was captured in 1281, but after a long war his father recognized the rights of the brothers in 1289. After the death of their cousin Frederick Tuta (1291), both brothers took possession of his lands and Frederick received the Margraviate of Meissen, leaving to their father only the Margraviate of Landsberg. However, King Adolf of Nassau-Weilburg thought that Meissen and the Eastern March should return to the crown after Tuta's death, and bought Thuringia from the debt-laden Albert. The brothers were again called to arms in the defense of their inheritance, but had to give up the land. Frederick stayed away from home until the death of Adolf returned his land to him. By now his father had also been reconciled with him. Soon afterwards, however, King Albert I claimed Thuringia and was supported by the cities, which longed to become independent (reichsunmittelbar). The landgrave's family was besieged on the Wartburg by the Eisenach forces; however, Frederick succeeded in liberating them. But only the victory at Lucka on 31 May 1307 gave the two brothers relief, and before the king could gather new forces, he died.

After Diezmann's death (1307) the vassals rendered homage to Frederick only, because Albert had renounced rule for an annuity. Only the cities were still opposed to Frederick. But Erfurt was subjected by force, and he was also reconciled with Emperor Henry VII, to whom Frederick had originally refused to submit. In 1310, the Emperor granted him his lands as fiefs.

However, the fight with Brandenburg still continued and when Frederick was captured by Margrave Waldemar, he had to buy his freedom with 32,000 marks of silver and the cession of Lower Lusatia in the Treaty of Tangermünde of 1312. The feuds were renewed in 1316, but ended in 1317 with the Magdeburg Peace. Through the extinction of the Ascanian house, Frederick regained all lost lands except for Landsberg and Lower Lusatia. Now he was able to install a general Landfrieden (peace).

Paralyzed by a stroke since 1321, Frederick died on 16 November 1323 at Eisenach. His bones were later moved to Grimmenstein Castle in Gotha and after its demolition were buried in Friedenstein Castle; however, his tomb was erected in Reinhardsbrunn. In 1285, he married Agnes, the daughter of Count Meinhard II of Gorizia-Tyrol and Elisabeth of Bavaria, widowed mother of Conradin, and after her death he married Elizabeth of Arnshaugk, the daughter of his stepmother, in 1303. Only two children survived him, Elizabeth, who was married to Henry II, Landgrave of Hesse, in 1322, and Frederick, his successor.

Family
Frederick married firstly Agnes of Gorizia-Tyrol (d. 14 May 1293) in 1286, daughter of Meinhard, Duke of Carinthia and Elisabeth of Bavaria. They had one son:
Frederick the Lame (9 May 1293 – 13 January 1315, Zwenkau), married Anna (d. 22 November 1327, Wismar), daughter of Albert II, Duke of Saxe-Wittenberg and Agnes Habsburg, Daughter of Rudolph I of Germany.

Secondly he married Elizabeth of Lobdeburg-Arnshaugk (1286 – 22 August 1359, Gotha) on 24 August 1300 and they had two children:

Elizabeth (1306–1368), married Henry II, Landgrave of Hesse, in 1322
Frederick II, Margrave of Meissen

Ancestry

References
 At Meyers Konversationslexikon, 1880
 Wegele: Friedrich der Freidige etc. und die Wettiner seiner Zeit. Nördlingen, 1870
 Friedrich der Freidige

People from Eisenach
House of Wettin
Margraves of Meissen
Landgraves of Thuringia
Rulers of Thuringia
1257 births
1323 deaths